Johann Rudolph Ahle (24 December 1625 – 9 July 1673) was a German composer, organist, theorist, and Protestant church musician.

Biography
Ahle was born in Mühlhausen, Thuringia. While not much is known of his early musical training, he attended the grammar school in Göttingen and then studied theology at the University of Erfurt from 1645 to 1649. In 1648 he published the Compendium per tenellis, a theoretical treatise on choral singing which was reprinted several times during his lifetime and for a last time 50 years later by his son Johann Georg (the last edition appeared in 1704).

In 1654 Ahle assumed the post of organist at the Divi Blasii in Mühlhausen. The next year he married Anna Maria Wölfer; their son, Johann Georg Ahle (1651–1706), was also a well-known composer and organist. Ahle was elected a town councillor in Mühlhausen in the 1650s, and was elected mayor shortly before his death in 1673. His immediate successor at the church was his son Johann Georg, and then briefly Johann Sebastian Bach, who worked in Mühlhausen in 1707/08.

Much of Ahle's compositional output consists of sacred choral and vocal works, instrumental music, and organ music. He is best known for motets and sacred concertos (most of them in German, some in Latin) contained in the collection Neu-gepflanzte Thüringische Lust-Garten, in welchem ... Neue Geistliche Musicalische Gewaechse mit 3, 4, 5, 6, 7, 8, 10 und mehr Stimmen auf unterschiedliche Arten mit und ohne Instrument ... versetzet (1657–65). He is also known for hymn melodies, of which three remain in the common German Protestant hymnal Evangelisches Gesangbuch, including "Liebster Jesu, wir sind hier" and "Morgenglanz der Ewigkeit". The melody of the latter was used by Friedrich Dörr for the Advent song "Kündet allen in der Not".

Notes

References

Cited sources 
 
 Uwe Wolf – Programme notes to BIS-CD-821, 1996  
 Markus Rathey, Johann Rudolph Ahle. 1625–1673. Lebensweg und Schaffen, Eisenach: Wagner, 1999
 Johann Rudolf Ahle (Composer) Bach Cantatas Website

External links
 
 
 

German classical composers
German Baroque composers
German classical organists
German male organists
1625 births
1673 deaths
17th-century classical composers
German male classical composers
17th-century male musicians
Male classical organists